Robert C. Buell (April 23, 1931 (in Boston) -- September 25, 2018) was an American insurance broker and politician who served in the Massachusetts House of Representatives from 1969 to 1979 and the Massachusetts Senate from 1979 to 1995.

A Republican, Buell ran for the 12th Essex State Representative seat in 1968 and won. He served in the Massachusetts House of Representatives until he ran for the 1st Essex Middlesex State Senate seat in 1979, which he also won. In the Senate, Buell was the Third Assistant Minority Leader from 1981 to 1983 and Second Assistant Minority Leader from 1983 to 1989 and again from 1991 to 1993.

References

1931 births
Republican Party members of the Massachusetts House of Representatives
Republican Party Massachusetts state senators
People from Boxford, Massachusetts
Boston University alumni
Living people
Union College (New York) alumni